Bernard I (c. 950 – 9 February 1011) was the Duke of Saxony between 973 and 1011, the second of the Billung dynasty, a son of Duke Herman and Oda. He extended his father's power considerably.

He fought the Danes in 974, 983, and 994 during their invasions. He supported the succession of Otto III over Henry the Wrangler. In 986, he was made marshal and in 991 and 995 he joined the young Otto on campaign against the Slavs. He increased his power vis-à-vis the crown, where his father had been the representative of the king to the tribe, Bernard was the representative of the tribe to the king. Bernard died in 1011 and was buried in the Church of Saint Michael in Lüneburg.

Family
In 990, Bernard married Hildegard (died 1011), daughter of Henry I the Bald, Count of Stade (died 976). They had the following issue:

Herman, died young
Bernard II, his successor
Thietmar, a count, died in a duel on 1 April 1048 in Pöhlde
Gedesdiu (or Gedesti) (died 30 June c. 1040), abbess of Metelen (from 993) and Herford (from 1002)

and probably:

Matilda, nun
Othelindis (died 9 March 1044), married Dirk III of Holland.

References 

 

Bernhard 01
House of Billung
950s births
1011 deaths
Year of birth uncertain
Burials at the Church of Saint Michael, Lüneburg
10th-century rulers in Europe
11th-century rulers in Europe
10th-century Saxon people
11th-century Saxon people